The Metropolitan Sepulchre was a massive pyramidal necropolis proposed for construction in Primrose Hill in London in the 19th century as a way of addressing the shortage of burial space in the London area. Designed by the architect Thomas Willson, it would have been 90 stories high, and capable of holding up to five million dead. The 18-acre footprint of the pyramid would have allowed a number of burials equal to 1000 acre of regular cemetery ground. Willson said that "Not many centuries will pass away before it will not only be completely filled, but that another one will be required."

The pyramid would have been faced with granite blocks, and had flights of stairs on every side, leading to an obelisk and astronomical observatory at the pyramid's peak. The project would have cost around £7 million. It was never built, and the need for it was supplanted by the creation of a ring of "garden cemeteries" around London.

See also 
 London Necropolis Railway

References 

Unbuilt buildings and structures in the United Kingdom
19th century in London